Phoebe Donovan (1902 – May 1998) was an Irish  flower, landscape and portrait artist.

Biography
Phoebe Donovan (1902–1998) was born in Wexford in 1902. She was educated privately before being sent to a French school in Wexford. Donovan began painting as part of a local art group. She then traveled to Rome and London. Donovan grew up on a farm and raised animals and sold eggs to gather the money needed to attend art college. Eventually Donovan attended the Dublin Metropolitan School of Art in 1927 and also the Royal Hibernian Academy Schools on St Stephen's Green. Sean Keating taught her portraiture. Her first exhibition was with the RHA in 1931. She exhibited again in 1933 with the Water Colour Society of Ireland. In 1948 she was elected a member and served on the committee from 1954 to 1987. Throughout the 1930s and 40s Donovan was a member of the Society of Dublin Painters. She died in her childhood home, Ballymore, County Wexford, in May 1998.

Solo exhibitions

 Old Stables Gallery, Ballymore, Camolin, Permanent Display
 Stephen O’ Mara Gallery, Dun Laoghaire, 1990
 Corish Picture Gallery, wexford, 1958, ’65, ’70
 Ritchie Hendricks Gallery, Dublin, 1956
 Charles Pilkington Showrooms, Dawson St. Dublin, 1955
 Dublin Painters Gallery, 1951
 The Country Shop Dublin, 1950

Group exhibitions
 Dun Laoghaire Arts Week, 1988
 Setanta Gallery, Dublin1977
 Graphic Studio retrospective Exhibition, 1976
 Dalkey Community Council, 1976 & 1987
 Municipal Gallery, Dublin, 1964
 Painters Group, 1961 & 1966
 Kilkenny Arts Society, 1961
 Munster Fine Art club, Cork, 1946
 Pastel Society, London, 1936
 Dublin Sketching Club, 1930
 Irish Watercolour Society, 1933 – 1997

References

1902 births
1998 deaths
20th-century Irish artists
20th-century Irish women artists
Alumni of the National College of Art and Design
Landscape artists
People from Wexford, County Wexford
Irish portrait painters